G. spectabilis may refer to:

Galearis spectabilis, an orchid species
Gastromyzon spectabilis, a fish species
Gonystylus spectabilis, a flowering plant species
Gurubira spectabilis, a beetle species
Guyanemorpha spectabilis, a beetle species
Guzmania spectabilis, a flowering plant species